Wyoming railway station is a railway station in Plympton–Wyoming in Lambton County, Ontario, Canada. It is a stop on Via Rail's Toronto–Sarnia train route. The station is wheelchair accessible. The shelter is set back off of Broadway Street in downtown Wyoming. Train 84 stops in Wyoming at 08:56 and Train 87 stops at 22:05, seven days a week. Reservations are required 40 minutes in advance for trains 84 and 87 to stop at this location.

See also

 Quebec City–Windsor Corridor (Via Rail) – trans-provincial passenger rail corridor which includes Wyoming
 Rail transport in Ontario

References

External links
 Wyoming train station on VIARail.ca

Via Rail stations in Ontario
Canadian National Railway stations in Ontario
Railway stations in Lambton County